Jeno may refer to:

 Jenő, a Hungarian given name
 Jenő (village), a village in Fejér county, Hungary
 Jeno Paulucci (1918–2011), American businessman and entrepreneur 
 Jeno's, Paulucci's brand of pizza products, now sold under the Totino's line by General Mills
 Jeno's Pizza (Colombia), a restaurant chain
 Jenné-Jeno, original site of Djenné, Mali
 Lee Je-no, South Korean singer and member of the boyband NCT Dream

See also